Hayastani Hanrapetutyun (also spelled Hayastany Hanrapetutyun, Romanization of ) is the official newspaper of Armenia.

The newspaper was founded on September 6, 1990 by the Armenian parliament as its official publication. In 2000-2001, the newspaper was converted into a joint-stock company with the President's Office, the National Assembly, the Armenian government, and the Department of Information each holding a 25% share.

See also
List of government gazettes
 Media of Armenia

References

1990 establishments in Armenia
Newspapers published in Armenia